The Bowdoin College Museum of Art is an art museum located in Brunswick, Maine.  Included on the National Register of Historic Places, the museum is located in a building on the campus of Bowdoin College designed by the architectural firm McKim, Mead, and White.

The Museum’s landmark Walker Art Building was commissioned for the College by Harriet and Sophia Walker in honor of their uncle, a Boston businessman who had supported the creation of the first small art gallery at Bowdoin in the mid-nineteenth century. Designed by Charles Follen McKim of McKim, Mead, & White, the building was completed in 1894 and is on the National Register of Historic Places.  At the entrance are a pair of Medici lion sculptures.

History
The museum's collection originated from separate donations of art from James Bowdoin III in 1811 and 1826.  Having been housed in a number of different locations during its history, the museum found a permanent home in the Walker Art Building in 1894.  While the building had been renovated once in 1974, the $20.8 million renovation by architects Machado and Silvetti Associates of Boston that finished in 2007 received a great deal of publicity for its creation of a new modern entrance to the museum while preserving the structural integrity of the original building.

References

External links

Museums in Cumberland County, Maine
Art museums and galleries in Maine
University museums in Maine
McKim, Mead & White buildings
Bowdoin College
Buildings and structures in Brunswick, Maine
Institutions accredited by the American Alliance of Museums
Tourist attractions in Brunswick, Maine
Art museums established in 1811
1811 establishments in Massachusetts